n-Butylamine is an organic compound (specifically, an amine) with the formula CH3(CH2)3NH2. This colourless liquid is one of the four isomeric amines of butane, the others being sec-butylamine, tert-butylamine, and isobutylamine. It is a liquid having the fishy, ammonia-like odor common to amines.  The liquid acquires a yellow color upon storage in air.  It is soluble in all organic solvents. It's vapours are heavier than air and it produces toxic oxides of nitrogen during combustion.

Synthesis and reactions
It is produced by the reaction of ammonia and alcohols over alumina:
CH3(CH2)3OH  +  NH3   →   CH3(CH2)3NH2  +  H2O

n-Butylamine is a weak base. The pKa of [CH3(CH2)3NH3]+ is 10.78.

n-Butylamine exhibits reactions typical of other simple alkyl amines, i.e., alkylation, acylation, condensation with carbonyls.
It forms complexes with metal ions, examples being cis- and trans-[PtI2(NH2Bu)2].

Uses
This compound is used as an ingredient in the manufacture of pesticides (such as thiocarbazides), pharmaceuticals, and emulsifiers. It is also a precursor for the manufacture of N,N′-dibutylthiourea, a rubber vulcanization accelerator, and n-butylbenzenesulfonamide, a plasticizer of nylon.  It is used in the synthesis of fengabine,  the fungicide benomyl, and butamoxane, and the antidiabetic tolbutamide.

Safety
The LD50 to rats through the oral exposure route is 366 mg/kg.

In regards to occupational exposures to n-butylamine, the Occupational Safety and Health Administration and National Institute for Occupational Safety and Health have set occupational exposure limits at a ceiling of 5 ppm (15 mg/m3) for dermal exposure.

References

External links

Alkylamines
Butyl compounds